Steve Lacy may refer to:

Music
Steve Lacy (saxophonist) (1934–2004), American jazz saxophonist and composer
Steve Lacy (singer) (born 1998), American musician

Other occupations
Steve Lacy (coach) (1908–2000), American college sports coach, educator, and political adviser
Steve Lacy (businessman) (born 1954), American magazine and media company executive
Steve Lacy (athlete) (fl. 1980–1984), American Olympic athlete

See also
 Stephen Lacey (disambiguation)